Sebastiania catingae is a species of flowering plant in the family Euphorbiaceae. It was described in 1908. It is native to Bahia, Brazil.

References

Plants described in 1908
catingae